Bilozerske is a city in Dobropillia municipality, Donetsk Oblast of Ukraine. Population is

History 
It was founded in 1913.

In 1966, the urban-type settlement became a city. In 1969, the population of the city was 20.6 thousand people, the basis of the economy was coal mining.

In 1980s the basis of the economy was coal mining and a mineral water plant. In January 1989, the population of the city was 21.1 thousand people

In January 2013 the population was 16,101 people.

Demographics
Native language as of the Ukrainian Census of 2001:
Russian  69.8%
Ukrainian  29.6%
Belarusian  0.1%

Gallery

References

Cities in Donetsk Oblast
Populated places established in 1913
Cities of district significance in Ukraine
Populated places established in the Russian Empire
1913 establishments in the Russian Empire
Pokrovsk Raion